The Seventh Doctor Adventures is a Big Finish Productions audio play series based on the television series Doctor Who. It sees the return of Sylvester McCoy reprising his role as the Seventh Doctor.

History
In 1999, beginning with the story "The Sirens of Time", Big Finish Productions began producing a series of audio adventures featuring the Fifth Doctor, Sixth Doctor and Seventh Doctor. For 22 years these stories continued collectively known as Big Finish's "Main Range". In May 2020, Big Finish announced the main range would conclude in March 2021 and subsequently replaced with regular releases of each Doctor's adventures continuing in their own respective ranges. Several previously released special titles were retroactively reallocated into these new ranges by Big Finish.

Cast

Notable Guests 
 Nicholas Briggs as Daleks & Ogrons

Episodes

Specials

The Seventh Doctor: The New Adventures (2018)

Silver & Ice (2022)

Sullivan and Cross – AWOL (2022)

The Seventh Doctor Adventures 2023A 
Two boxsets have scheduled for 2023. The first is scheduled for June 2023.

The Seventh Doctor Adventures 2023B 
The second is scheduled for November 2023.

References

Audio plays based on Doctor Who
Big Finish Productions
Doctor Who spin-offs
Seventh Doctor audio plays